Freddie Garcia (born 7 July 1952) is a Mexican former football forward who spent seven seasons in the North American Soccer League and two in the Major Indoor Soccer League.

Born in Mexico, Garcia grew up in the United States. In 1973, he signed with the Dallas Tornado of the North American Soccer League. He would play seven seasons with the Tornado, the last in 1979. He also played two seasons in the Major Indoor Soccer League, the 1978–79 season with the Cleveland Force and the 1979–1980 season with the Wichita Wings.

References

External links
 NASL/MISL stats

1958 births
Living people
Footballers from Guanajuato
Mexican emigrants to the United States
American sportspeople of Mexican descent
American soccer players
Association football forwards
Dallas Tornado players
Cleveland Force (original MISL) players
Wichita Wings (MISL) players
Major Indoor Soccer League (1978–1992) players
North American Soccer League (1968–1984) players
Mexican footballers